Stephen Cheong Kam-chuen, CBE, JP (31 May 1941 – 18 May 1993) was a Hong Kong industrialist and politician. He was a member of the Legislative Council of Hong Kong from 1980 to 1993 until his sudden death from a heart attack.

Biography
He was born on 31 May 1941 in Hong Kong and was educated at the La Salle College. He obtained his Bachelor of Science in Engineering and Diploma of Imperial College from the Imperial College and Master of Philosophy from the London University.

After he returned to Hong Kong, he joined the textile industry and became the managing director of the Lee Wah Weaving Factory and Cheong's Textile Co.. He was member of the general committee of the Hong Kong General Chamber of Commerce and deputy chairman and chairman of the Federation of Hong Kong Industries, the two leading chambers of commerce in the colony.

He was appointed to various public posts, including chairman of the Transport Complaints Unit, member of Economic Review Committee, Hong Kong Export Credit Insurance Corporation Advisory Board, Hong Kong Industrial Estates Corporation, Public Accounts Committee, Transport Advisory Committee and UMELCO Police Group.

He was first appointed to the Legislative Council of Hong Kong in 1980. He was a leading representative of the business interests in the 1980s. In the first Legislative Council election in 1985, he represented the Federation of Hong Kong Industries to run uncontestedly in the First Industrial functional constituency. He opposed to the pro-democracy faction calling for the faster pace of democratisation during the 1988 Hong Kong electoral reform. He was the founding president of the Hong Kong Foundation, a conservative lobby group in the early 1990s.

He suddenly died on 18 May 1993 from a heart attack at the age of 51.

References

1941 births
1993 deaths
Hong Kong industrialists
Business and Professionals Federation of Hong Kong politicians
Hong Kong textiles industry businesspeople
Commanders of the Order of the British Empire
HK LegCo Members 1985–1988
HK LegCo Members 1988–1991
HK LegCo Members 1991–1995
Hong Kong Basic Law Consultative Committee members
Hong Kong Affairs Advisors